The 2011–12 Argentine Primera B Metropolitana is the season of third division professional of football in Argentina. A total of 21 teams will compete; the champion will be promoted to Argentine Primera B Nacional.

Club information

Table

Standings

Torneo Reducido
The quarterfinals will be played as single elimination, at the stadium of the higher-placed team. Seeding for the semifinals and final is determined by the team standings in the regular season.

Relegation

Relegation Playoff Matches

|-
!colspan="5"|Relegation/promotion playoff

|-
|}

See also
2011–12 in Argentine football

References

External links
List of Argentine second division champions by RSSSF

3
Primera B Metropolitana seasons